The Movement Party was a centre-left liberal monarchists political group during the July Monarchy.<ref>Civilization and Society in the West. p. 439.</ref>

The party sat on the centre-left of the Chamber of Deputies between the small republican opposition and the centrist conservative-liberal Third Party, but to the left from the conservative Resistance Party.

 History 
The founder of the Movement Party was Jacques Laffitte, an Orléanist banker who supported the July Revolution of 1830. For his role in the King Louis Philippe I's coronation, Lafitte was charged to form a government, but last only six months as the King became more conservative over time. The party members were Orléanists who believed that the Charter of 1830 was a step toward a more democratic regime and they actively supported progressive policies such as a strong parliamentary system, expanded suffrage and self-determination against foreign interests.

After the fall of Lafitte, Adolphe Thiers became the party leader. Thiers was well linked with the King and was Minister of the Interior in the Édouard Mortier's cabinet. As Minister of the Interior, Thiers was charged to repress the Canut revolts of 1834 and also supported repressive laws after Giuseppe Marco Fieschi's assassination attempt against Louis Philippe. Thiers was also appointed as Prime Minister briefly in 1836 and 1840, but his political fortune lost when his support to Muhammad Ali's independence claim from the Ottoman Empire caused tensions with United Kingdom and Prussia.

Definitively confinated to the opposition, the Movement Party unified the other group hostile toward the conservative governments of Louis Philippe. The party launched several Campagne des banquets'' to support an expanded suffrage. The party definitively dissolved when the tensions of 1848–1849 exploded in the February Revolution that brought to Louis Philippe's fall and birth of the Second French Republic. Many members of the Movement Party became Moderate Republicans or merged in the Party of Order.

Electoral results

See also 
 History of France

References 

Bourbon Restoration
1830 establishments in France
1848 disestablishments in France
Orléanist parties
Liberal parties in France
Classical liberal parties
Progressive parties
Centre-left parties in Europe